The Arandilla is a river found in the southeast of Burgos province, Spain.  It runs through the following municipalities:

 Arandilla
 Baños de Valdearados 
 Brazacorta 
 Coruña del Conde 
 Fresnillo de las Dueñas 
 Hontoria de Valdearados 
 Peñaranda de Duero 
 Quemada 
 San Juan del Monte
 Tubilla del Lago 
 Vadocondes 
 La Vid y Barrios 
 Zazuar

Rivers of Spain
Rivers of Burgos
Rivers of Castile and León
Tributaries of the Douro River